Emily Prentiss is a fictional character on the CBS crime drama Criminal Minds, portrayed by Paget Brewster. Prentiss first appeared in "The Last Word" (episode nine of season two), replacing Agent Elle Greenaway (Lola Glaudini), who had quit in "The Boogeyman". Her role in the show's sixth season was reduced, for what Brewster believed to be financial reasons. Brewster returned to her role for the show's seventh season. Her final episode as a main cast member was the May 16, 2012 episode "Run." Brewster reprised the role again in 2014 for the 200th episode. She returned as Prentiss following the departure of co-star Shemar Moore for the season 11 episode "Tribute".

Brewster returned as series regular in season 12. She was brought back soon after co-star Thomas Gibson had been dismissed from the show.

Background
Prentiss was born on October 12, 1970 to an unnamed father and wife Elizabeth, a US Ambassador. Due to her mother's job postings, Prentiss spent her childhood in numerous places, including Ukraine, France, Italy, and various countries in the Middle East.

Because her family moved so often, Prentiss had few friends growing up, and as a teenager sought the sense of belonging she craved in sexual promiscuity. She eventually became pregnant at age 15, while living in Rome with her parents, and had an abortion at a reproductive health clinic, accompanied and helped by her then most intimate friend, Matthew Benton, who later, ostensibly, makes her sit in the church's front seat with him, despite the common knowledge of what she did and against the priest's will. Matthew's devoted but fanatically religious parents forbade him to see her again, responsabilizing her for having deviated him, and made him feel so guilty about helping her get an abortion that he descended into drug addiction. Years later, they become convinced that his addiction was caused by demonic possession, and hire a sanctioned Catholic exorcist priest, Father Paul Silvano (Carmen Argenziano), to perform an exorcism that results in his death from a heart attack.

Learning about it from a common teenage friend of hers and Benton, who had remained in touch with the last, John Cooley (Walton Goggins), Prentiss leads the BAU team in bringing her friend's killer to justice. Father Silvano appears to be performing intentionally fatal exorcisms, Benton's and two previous, as a revenge against their "dark souls", open to possession, for, according to him, having caused the death of his colleague priest Father Del Toro to prevent pilgrimages from occurring. Father Del Toro was, in turn, seemingly killed by Father Silvano's victims with a powerful drug that induced a heart attack, and, as such, he allegedly uses the same drug in his Holy Water during the exorcisms. Cooley is exorcised as the fourth and last target by Father Silvano, showing possession signs to him, but is interrupted by the team and extradicted to the Vatican, while leaving them the warning they are allowing a dangerous enemy to escape. At the end, Cooley apologizes to Emily for not having been in Rome for her when she aborted, which might mean as a friend or suggest that he was the one who got her pregnant.

She graduated from Chesapeake Bay University with a B.A. in Criminal Justice, a fictitious university which is implied to be located in the Georgetown section of Washington, D.C., and then from Yale University before joining the FBI, and had worked at its field offices in the Midwest before coming to the Behavioral Analysis Unit (BAU). Prentiss is extremely well-travelled due to her upbringing as an ambassador's daughter and her previous assignments while at Interpol. She is fluent in Arabic, Spanish, French, Italian, Russian (can hold a conversation but is limited), and Greek.

Prentiss first appeared in the season two episode "The Last Word". Her appearance surprises both SSA Aaron Hotchner (Thomas Gibson) and Jason Gideon (Mandy Patinkin), as neither supervisor had signed off on the transfer. Hotchner is immediately suspicious of the new agent, but Prentiss, insisting that her mother had not pulled any strings for her to get the assignment, convinces him to let her join the team on a probationary basis, and eventually proves her competence and gains the team's trust.

Prentiss was originally written as a lesbian and had a storyline where she woke up in bed next to a woman, which the creative team and Brewster were on board for, but CBS reportedly nixed the idea. In a 2016 interview, following Brewster's return to the show, she stated that she would still "be happy to play Emily as bisexual or gay."

Relationships with colleagues

Initially upon joining the BAU, Prentiss feels like an outsider and often worries that people doubt her ability as a profiler. Over time, Prentiss proves herself through her sharp profiling skills, competence, and dedication to the work, gradually earning the trust and respect of her fellow BAU team members.

Prentiss has a good relationship with her supervisor Aaron Hotchner and establishes herself as one of the most reliable and capable agents on the BAU. Hotchner had previously worked as the Head of Security for Prentiss's Ambassador mother, Elizabeth Prentiss, but did not cross paths with Prentiss, because she was off to Yale University. When she joins the BAU, they get off to a rocky start, but after a confrontation in his office about her feelings and opinions regarding politics and after she resigns instead of secretly feeding reports to Section Chief Erin Strauss (Jayne Atkinson), Hotchner begins to understand and trust Prentiss. Before leaving to be with the BAU on a case despite his suspension from the field, Hotchner stops by Prentiss' apartment to convince her to get on the plane with him to help their team solve the case they are currently working on.

In "52 Pickup", Hotchner is seen asking Prentiss for advice on how to deal with Agent Jordan Todd (Meta Golding), and acts on her suggestions, even giving Todd another chance to prove herself.

For the most part, Prentiss has also developed friendly relationships with the other members of the BAU team.

Prentiss immediately bonds with Agent Derek Morgan (Shemar Moore) due to their mutual love of Kurt Vonnegut, and they develop a close relationship. Their strong bond is most evident in the episodes leading up to and after Prentiss' faked death. Morgan is able to detect that Prentiss is worried about something and tries to get her to tell him what is bothering her. He also feels betrayed when Prentiss does not reveal the extent of her involvement with Doyle and the case and assumes she does not trust him enough. Rossi later tries to reason with him that Prentiss is merely trying to protect the BAU team. Morgan is also with Prentiss, holding her, when she is dying after being seriously injured by Doyle, and tells her that he understands what she did, and that she is brave, and he is proud of her. When he believes she has died, Morgan takes her death quite hard and expresses anger toward Doyle. When Emily returns to the BAU in season 7, Morgan shows concern for her safety and ability to protect herself in the field by making her sign up for re-certification.

Over time, she also forms a close relationship with Agent Jennifer "JJ" Jareau (A.J. Cook), especially when they are the only two female agents in the BAU in the field for several seasons. When Prentiss has to fake her death for the team's safety, Jareau is the only one (aside from Hotchner) who knows the truth. Jareau also flies to Paris and is involved in getting fake passports and setting up bank accounts for Prentiss to stay incognito. In the rare moments outside work, Jareau and Prentiss have been seen talking about children and the men, or lack thereof, in Prentiss' life. Prentiss is also the first to congratulate Jareau when she reveals she is pregnant for the first time.

After Agent Spencer Reid (Matthew Gray Gubler) returns to work following his abduction by serial killer Tobias Hankel (James Van Der Beek), Prentiss experiences a falling out with Reid when he begins behaving erratically; it is later revealed that Reid is suffering from post-traumatic stress disorder as a result of his kidnapping, and has been abusing prescription drugs to numb the pain. Eventually, however, Prentiss helps him confront his personal demons and get help for his addiction. Prentiss sometimes joins in with Morgan in good-naturedly teasing Reid about his social awkwardness. She also amazes Reid when she beats him at poker, which he has never lost at before. Another turning point in their relationship is when Prentiss and Reid are held captive by a cult and Prentiss admits she is an FBI agent, causing her to suffer a beating from the cult's leader, Benjamin Cyrus (Luke Perry). As a result, Reid feels guilty, but Prentiss reassures him everything is all right and that her injuries are not his fault. Prentiss is also the only one Reid tells about his recurring headaches. Reid is one of the most affected by Prentiss' "death", sobbing on Jareau's shoulder because he never got to say goodbye. Later, when Prentiss comes back, Reid feels betrayed by Prentiss for not telling him the truth, but Prentiss confronts him and they eventually reconcile.

Prentiss is often seen hanging out with Jareau and Technical Analyst Penelope Garcia (Kirsten Vangsness) outside of work. Garcia looks up to Prentiss, admiring her fluency in Arabic, her wit, and the fact she took up salsa dancing classes. Garcia also notes that after four years with the team, Prentiss is a part of the "BAU family"; they have a close friendship.

On the job
Prentiss is shown to be an extremely competent, level-headed agent. She is not as affected by the nightmares that come with the job and manages to keep her cool in hostile confrontations. She is also shown to put herself in the line of fire, for example, volunteering to enter into the unsub's house to rescue his young son, and sacrifice herself for her teammates, as she does for Reid once in the season 4 episode, "Minimal Loss". She does not act rashly and there is only one rare occasion where she allows her personal feelings to interfere with investigations. It has been mentioned by Morgan that she has problems trusting others, preferring to handle things independently instead of asking for help, but it is revealed that this reluctance is due to her background as an undercover agent.

Ian Doyle and "death"
In the sixth season, Prentiss is notified by her former superiors at Interpol that arms dealer Ian Doyle (Timothy V. Murphy) has escaped from prison in North Korea. Later, after returning home from work, Prentiss receives several hang-up calls on her home phone from an unknown caller. She then realizes that someone might be watching her, so she sets up noise traps and sits in a chair in front of the door with a gun. Upon her return home on a subsequent night, she finds an anonymous gift on her doorstep, containing a single purple flower. She experiences a flashback to a past undercover job in a Tuscan villa in Italy under the alias Lauren Reynolds, during which she was acting as his girlfriend and observing Doyle. Recognizing that the gift of the purple flower means Doyle knows where she lives, Prentiss flees. In "Coda", Prentiss enlists two former Interpol colleagues in hunting Doyle. In "Valhalla", Tsia Mosely (Siena Goines), one of her former Interpol colleagues, is shot in the head by Doyle. At the end of that episode, Prentiss sneaks out of a meeting in order to save her BAU colleagues from Doyle.

At the beginning of "Lauren", it is revealed that Prentiss had been a spy eight years previously, on a task force profiling terrorists; while undercover, she met Doyle and became his lover. Her betrayal of Doyle led to his arrest and subsequent imprisonment, including time in a North Korean prison. Prentiss tracks down Doyle in Boston and tries to kill him, but he takes her hostage. Later, Rossi realized that she left their team meeting suddenly in order to protect them from Doyle as it was Prentiss that Doyle was after. Hotch says they will treat Doyle as an "unsub" (unidentified subject) and Prentiss as his victim, and profile them just as they would in any other case.

They eventually track them down to an abandoned building in Boston and arrive with a SWAT team. Prentiss reveals to Doyle that his son, Declan Jones, whom Doyle believed had been killed with his pretending mother and Doyle's former housekeeper Louise Jones, is actually alive with her, and that she herself staged photos of executing them both in order to get Doyle to break under interrogation in North Korea. After an intense fight, Doyle manages to stab Prentiss in the abdomen with a broken table leg. Even though she is dying, she refuses to tell him where his son is hiding, and Doyle escapes shortly before Morgan reaches her. In the hospital, the BAU team is notified by JJ that Prentiss has never made it off the table. They are seen attending her funeral, on March 7, 2011. The last scene, however, reveals she is alive and in Paris, where JJ meets her and gives her an envelope with "passports from three different countries, and a bank account in each one to keep [her] comfortable". Her pet cat Sergio is then adopted by Garcia.

Returning to the BAU
In the season seven premiere, Morgan captures Doyle, and Prentiss returns to the BAU to assist the team in finding who kidnapped Doyle's son, Declan, namely his mother, another felon, Chloe Donahy. The team comes under fire from the judiciary panel for their retaliatory actions to avenge Prentiss' death, but everyone stands their ground to protect the team. Section Chief Erin Strauss later reveals to them that the committee was persuaded by Prentiss' defense and eventually decided to lift the BAU's suspensions although they will still be "keeping a close eye" on the members. Reid, who is still angry over her "death", refuses to speak to her or Jareau, or even look them in the eye. At the end of "Proof", Prentiss talks it through with him and they make amends. In the premiere it is also revealed that Garcia has been taking care of her cat, Sergio, and when she inquires about him, Garcia jokingly states that she wants visitation rights.

In the season seven finale, Prentiss receives an offer to run Interpol's London office. While still pondering her decision on the offer, Prentiss decides to leave the BAU. In the season eight premiere, Morgan and Garcia mention seeing her while they were in London.

Brewster returned for guest appearances in the season 9 episode "200" in 2014 and the season 11 episode "Tribute" in early 2016 before returning as a regular cast member in the season 12 episode "Taboo" later in the year.

In Season 12, Prentiss becomes the Unit Chief of the BAU, following Hotchner's departure.

References

External links

Criminal Minds characters
Fictional Behavioral Analysis Unit agents
Fictional characters from Washington, D.C.
Television characters introduced in 2006
Fictional linguists
American female characters in television